Wolf Parade is a Canadian indie rock band formed in 2003 in Montreal. The band released three full-length albums before taking a five-year hiatus in 2011. They announced their return in 2016, releasing a self-titled EP in May of that year, and a fourth studio album, Cry Cry Cry, in October 2017. Their fifth studio album, Thin Mind, was released on January 24, 2020.

History
Wolf Parade began in April 2003, when former Frog Eyes member Spencer Krug was offered a gig by Grenadine Records' Alex Megelas. With only a three-week deadline to form a band, Krug contacted a fellow Canadian guitarist Dan Boeckner (formerly of British Columbia band Atlas Strategic) and began writing songs in Krug's apartment. Initially using a drum machine for their rhythm section played through computer speakers, Krug later invited Arlen Thompson to the lineup as the drummer; however, the newly formed trio rehearsed as a full band only the day before their first show. During the tour, Wolf Parade recorded and released their self-titled debut EP (also known as their 4 Song EP).

In September 2003, Hadji Bakara joined Wolf Parade, contributing his synthesizer and sound manipulation skills to the lineup. By the summer of 2004 the band released its second independent, self-titled EP, commonly referred to as the 6 Song EP.

In September 2004, the band traveled to Portland, Oregon to record with Modest Mouse's Isaac Brock. Brock had recently signed the band to Sub Pop when he was an A&R man for the label at the time. He had known Dan Boeckner from his days in Atlas Strategic, who had toured with Modest Mouse and were offered a Sub Pop signing just before the band split up. Wolf Parade spent two and a half weeks working 14-hour days in Portland. After some remixing, the band returned to Montreal to finish recording. The album was scheduled for a May release, but then pushed back. On its new record label, the band released its first widely distributed EP, Wolf Parade, in July 2005.

In September 2005, the band's debut album Apologies to the Queen Mary was released on Sub Pop Records to critical acclaim, earning a 2006 Polaris Music Prize nomination.

Dante DeCaro (formerly of Hot Hot Heat) joined sometime in 2005 as a second guitarist and percussionist. In 2008, an arrangement by Kenji Fusé of the Wolf Parade song "I'll Believe in Anything" for full symphony orchestra received a reading by the Victoria Symphony.

The band's second album, At Mount Zoomer, followed in June 2008. An on-stage announcement in November 2008 that Dante DeCaro would no longer be playing with the band was later revealed to have been a joke. Hadji Bakara left the band in 2008 to pursue an academic career in literature.

Wolf Parade reconvened in November 2009 to begin work on their third album, Expo 86. In an interview with Exclaim! magazine, Dan Boeckner stated that the album may be released as a double album or as an LP and an EP, given the sheer number of quality songs to come out of the sessions. The five members realized they had all been at Vancouver's World Fair in the same week when they were kids, which is how the album got its name. The album was produced by Howard Bilerman and was released in the United States on June 29, 2010.

In 2010, the song "Shine a Light" from Apologies to the Queen Mary appeared in the "Criminal Minds" episode "The Fight".

Wolf Parade kicked off their 2010 North American tour in Montreal. Following the tour, the band announced it would go on indefinite hiatus after playing a small number of shows in 2011, including the Sasquatch! Music Festival.

On January 14, 2016, Wolf Parade updated their website adding "2016" and launched new Twitter and Instagram pages, indicating the band's return from hiatus. The following day, they announced a series of concert dates for later that year, and that they had been working on new music. On October 6, 2017 the band released their fourth album titled Cry Cry Cry.

On February 4, 2019, Wolf Parade announced that Dante DeCaro had decided to leave the band and that they would carry on touring and composing as a trio.

Wolf Parade released their fifth studio album, Thin Mind, on January 24, 2020.

In April 2022, the band announced a series of shows where they would perform Apologies to the Queen Mary in its entirety. The band also confirmed that Bakara would return for the tour, marking his first shows with Wolf Parade in 14 years.

Members
Current members
Spencer Krug – vocals, keyboards, synthesizers (2003–2011, 2016–present)
Dan Boeckner – vocals, guitar (2003–2011, 2016–present)
Arlen Thompson – drums (2003–2011, 2016–present)
Hadji Bakara – synthesizers (2003–2008, 2022–present)

Former members
Dante DeCaro - bass, guitar, percussion, keyboards (2005–2011, 2016–2019)

Other work
Wolf Parade has been referred to as a "supergroup in reverse", as the members have achieved success with numerous projects formed after Wolf Parade. Additionally, Dante DeCaro's previous band Hot Hot Heat had received acclaim for their first album, Make Up the Breakdown, prior to his departure. Below is a partial list of the members' other projects:

 Spencer Krug releases solo music under the name of Moonface and was the lead singer of now-defunct rock band Sunset Rubdown. He was previously in Frog Eyes, Fifths of Seven, and Swan Lake. Beginning in 2021, Krug began recording albums under his own name and on his own label Pronounced Kroog. As of June 2022, he has released two albums in this manner: Fading Graffiti and Twenty Twenty Twenty Twenty One. 
 Arlen Thompson played drums on the Arcade Fire song "Wake Up". He also helped produce both Handsome Furs albums at his Mount Zoomer recording studio in Montreal. He is a member of the side project formerly known as Treasure Hunt, whose name was changed to avoid confusion with the moniker of experimental musician, Myles Byrne-Dunhill.
 Dan Boeckner was formerly a member of the indie rock duo Handsome Furs which he formed with his now ex-wife, Alexei Perry. Before joining Wolf Parade, Boeckner played in Atlas Strategic. He would go on to play in the bands Divine Fits and Operators. In 2022, Boeckner joined Arcade Fire in a session capacity, touring with the band in support of the band's sixth studio album, WE.
 Dante DeCaro fronts a project called Johnny and the Moon. Prior to Wolf Parade, DeCaro played in Hot Hot Heat.
 Hadji Bakara is a member of the synth-bass-dance-rap production team Megasoid, along with Speakerbruiser Rob, formerly Sixtoo. He also helped with treatments on "Black Mirror", "Neon Bible" and "My Body Is a Cage" off Arcade Fire's album Neon Bible.

Discography

Studio albums

EPs
Wolf Parade (2003) Self-released
Wolf Parade (2004) Self-released
Wolf Parade (2005) Sub Pop
Wolf Parade (2016) Self-released

Singles
 "Modern World" (2006, Sub Pop)
 "Shine a Light" (2006, Sub Pop)
 "I'll Believe in Anything" (2006, Sub Pop)
 "Call it a Ritual" (2008, Sub Pop)
 "Language City" (2008, Sub Pop)
 "Semi-Precious Stone" / "Agents of Love" (2010, Sub Pop)
 "Valley Boy" (2017, Sub Pop)
 "You're Dreaming" (2017, Sub Pop)
 "King of Piss and Paper" (2017, Sub Pop)
 "Against the Day" (2019, Sub Pop)
 "Forest Green" (2019, Sub Pop)
"Julia Take Your Man Home" (2020, Sub Pop)

Music videos 

 "Julia Take Your Man Home" (2020)
 "Against the Day" (2019)
 "King of Piss and Paper/Artificial Life" (2017)
 "You're Dreaming" (2017)
 "Valley Boy" (2017)
 "Yulia" (2010)
 "Modern World" (2006)
 "I'll Believe in Anything" (2005)
 "Shine a Light" (2005)

Compilation appearances
 "Claxxon's Lament" on The Believer 2005 Music Issue CD

Notes

References

External links

 Official website
 Unofficial website
 Wolf Parade at Sub Pop

Musical groups established in 2003
Canadian indie rock groups
Musical groups from Montreal
English-language musical groups from Quebec
Sub Pop artists
2003 establishments in Quebec